Diamond Springs is an unincorporated community in Morris County, Kansas, United States.

History
Diamond Springs takes its name from a stream which was a landmark and watering place for travelers on the Santa Fe Trail, which is located about 4 miles north on private property.

The post office in Diamond Springs was discontinued in 1930.

Education
The community is served by Morris County USD 417 public school district.

References

Further reading

External links
 Diamond Springs History, legendsofkansas.com
 Diamond Springs - Lost Kansas Communities
 Historic Images of Diamond Springs, Special Photo Collections at Wichita State University Library.
 Morris County maps: Current, Historic, KDOT

Unincorporated communities in Morris County, Kansas
Unincorporated communities in Kansas